Oedaspis schatchi is a species of tephritid or fruit flies in the genus Oedaspis of the family Tephritidae.

Distribution
Taiwan.

References

Tephritinae
Insects described in 2002
Diptera of Asia